Storskogens SK is a Swedish football club located in Sundbyberg.

Background
Storskogens SK currently plays in Division 4 Stockholm Norra which is the sixth tier of Swedish football. They play their home matches at the Sundbybergs IP in Sundbyberg.

The club is affiliated to Stockholms Fotbollförbund.

Season to season

Footnotes

External links
 Storskogens SK – Official website

Football clubs in Stockholm
1956 establishments in Sweden